Anoop Krishnan (born 7 May 1990) is an Indian television actor, director and anchor, who works predominantly in Malayalam film industry. He is mainly noted for the role Kalyan in the television series Seetha Kalyanam telecasted in Asianet.

He contested in the third season of the Malayalam reality TV series Bigg Boss.

Early and personal life

Anoop was born to Unnikrishnan K and K. M Shobhana Devi in Pattambi, Palakkad, Kerala. He has two siblings, Akhilesh Krishnan and Akhila Krishnan. He had his primary education from AUP School, Muthuthala and high school at PHS Pallippuram. He did his vocational higher secondary from VHSE Koppam. He is a graduate in B.A Literature from SNGS & Co-Operative College, Pattambi.

On 23 January 2022, Anoop married his long-time girlfriend Dr. Aishwarya Nair at Guruvayur Temple.

Career
In 2010, Anoop Krishnan was selected for the movie Face in Facebook directed by Jibin George James. Unfortunately, this project was not completed due to technical reasons and Anoop shifted his career into anchoring live stage shows. He started doing anchoring for various stage shows and continued to perform for more than 80 stages both in India and abroad with Malabar Maholtsavam, DTPC Onam fest and National Games closing ceremony among few of them. It was during this period that he got callback into two back-to-back movies alongside Mammootty – Daivathinte Swantham Cleetus directed by G. Marthandan (2013) and Praise the Lord directed by Shibu Gangadharan (2014). Unfortunately, those two characters didn't get much of an attention.

In 2014, Anoop's mentor and music director Sunny Viswanath introduced him to Padma Shri Balachandra Menon for doing a stage show in Dubai and that got him an opportunity to assist Balachandra Menon on his comeback movie Njan Samvidhanam Cheyyum which was released in 2015. While doing that movie, he got selected for doing a lead role in a Sanskrit movie called Ishti directed by G. Prabha. Anoop learned Kathakali Padam and trained himself in making kadhakali ornaments and handicrafts. He also has reduced 11 kg to play the character in the movie. He got attention from national and international film fraternity. Ishti made him to walk through red carpet of Indian Panorama of IFFI held at Goa held in 2016.

By 2015, he started making short music videos, documentaries and short films. Some of works were selected for Malayalam TV channels. One of his documentary – 'Raise of hope' was done for kidney related diseases and its awareness, with the help and support of Dr. Jayant Thomas Mathew (Nephrologist in Amala Institute of Medical Sciences) and Sunny Viswanath. During this time, Anoop did minor roles in cinemas like Sarvopari Palakkaran(2017) directed by Venugopan, Ennaalum Sarath..? (2018) directed by Balachandra Menon and Contessa directed by Sudip E.S (2018). He was a male lead character in known commercial movie called Ammamarathanalil (2017) directed by Jibin George James. He gained 8 kg to play a middle-aged character in the movie Ammamarathanalil.

In 2018, director Sunil Kariattukara selected him for a television serial called Seetha Kalyanam telecasted in Asianet and Hotstar. He turned a household name with his lead character 'Kalyan' in this television show and his on-screen chemistry with actress Dhanya Mary Varghese is widely appreciated as well. He, alongside actress Dhanya Mary Varghese, received the Asianet Television Award for the best pair . He was also nominated for the best actor and popular actor category in the same year.

At the end of 2019, Anoop Krishan's suspense thriller short film 'De-javu' was successfully released on Christmas Day and received broad attention.

Filmography

Films

|}

Television

Awards & Recognitions

Asianet Television Awards

 2019 – Best Pair (with Dhanya Mary Varghese) for Seetha Kalyanam
2022- Best Anchor for Star music

Recognitions

 2016 – Indian Panorama recognition for Inaugural Ishti

2021- Participated as a contestant in Bigg Boss Malayalam Season 3.

References

External links
 
 https://www.imdb.com/name/nm12705172/?ref_=tt_rv_t0

Living people
1990 births
Male actors in Malayalam television
Male actors in Malayalam cinema
Bigg Boss Malayalam contestants